Universities Allied for Essential Medicines (UAEM) is a student-led organization working to improve access to and affordability of medicines around the world, and to increase research and development of drugs for neglected tropical diseases.
Supported by an active board of directors and guided by an advisory board that includes Partners in Health co-founder Paul Farmer and Nobel Laureate Sir John Sulston, UAEM has mobilized hundreds of students on more than 100 campuses in more than 20 countries. These student advocates have convinced universities worldwide to adopt equitable global access licensing policies for licensing their medical research, in order to make life-saving health innovations affordable and accessible in low and middle income countries. UAEM has published two student-led research projects—the University Report Card, which ranks universities on their contributions to global health and has received coverage in The New York Times and others; and Re:Route, a mapping of biomedical research and development (R&D) alternatives.

The organization has worked globally on a campaign aimed at encouraging the WHO to discuss an R&D agreement, and is now currently working on a campaign targeting agencies providing public funding for biomedical research around the world under the name Take Back Our Medicines (TBOM).

Chapters 
The basic units of the organizations are called chapters. A chapter is a self-organised group of students, primarily based at an academic institution often with faculty support. Chapters range in size, from more intimate groups of 2 or 3, to larger gatherings of around 30 or more students. UAEM chapters are present in the US, United Kingdom, Canada, Australia, Iran, India, Brazil, Sudan, Austria, Switzerland, Germany, Denmark and The Netherlands.

Chapters in The Netherlands 
In The Netherlands there are four chapters: Amsterdam, Utrecht, Groningen and UAEM Maastricht.

Coronavirus pandemic 
Universities Allied for Essential Medicines suggested that government should require necessary measures are in place for availability and affordability of COVID-19 related drugs, tests, or vaccines.

See also 
 Essential medicines
 Médecins Sans Frontières's Campaign for Access to Essential Medicines
 Patent
 Technology transfer

References

External links
 Universities Allied for Essential Medicines
 Biotech:  Not Just for the Rich
 Medical students as champions for social justice
 LegalEase on CKUT FM: Episode 6 - Mining for Law
 University Global Health Impact Report Card

Intellectual property activism
Tropical medicine organizations
Medical and health organizations based in Washington, D.C.
Organizations established in 2001